Three ships of the Japanese Navy have been named Tsugaru:

  was previously the Russian cruiser Pallada launched in 1899 and renamed following capture by Japan in 1908. She was stricken in 1922 and scuttled in 1924
  was a minelayer launched in 1940 and sunk in 1944
  was a minelayer launched in 1955 and converted to a cable ship 1957

Japanese Navy ship names
Imperial Japanese Navy ship names